Ghost Years was a Brazilian/Dutch Hardcore punk band from Amsterdam, formed in 2016 and signed to White Russian Records. The band split up at the end of 2017.

History 
Ghost Years began in 2016 with the release of their self titled EP Ghost Years on White Russian Records. In 2017, Ghost Years released a single titled Eat. Sleep. Work. Repeat on White Russian Records.

Members 
 Laurens Kuppens – drums
 Lucas Feliciano– rhythm guitar, backing vocals
 Robert Rozendaal – lead guitar, backing vocals
 Victor de Meijier – lead vocals

Associated acts  
Members of Ghost Years went on to play in a variety of different acts. Robert Rozendaal toured with multiple bands such as First Blood, All For Nothing and Siberian Meatgrinder. Laurens Kuppens formed Port Violette, releasing an EP in early 2018. In 2020, Lucas Felicianio joined None Shall Fall as their guitarplayer. Victor de Meijier started a new band in 2020, called SWELL. The band has released one demo and 2 singles called "Dying Kiss", "Blacklist" and "King of Lies" through Blindsided Records.

Discography 
EPs and splits
 Ghost Years (2016, White Russian Records)

Singles
 Eat. Sleep. Work. Repeat. (2017, White Russian Records)

References 

Dutch hardcore punk groups
Musical groups from Amsterdam
Musical groups established in 2016
2016 establishments in the Netherlands